Ackerman Nunatak is an isolated nunatak,  high, standing  south-southeast of Butler Rocks in northern Forrestal Range, Pensacola Mountains. Mapped by United States Geological Survey (USGS) from surveys and U.S. Navy air photos, 1956–66. Named by Advisory Committee on Antarctic Names (US-ACAN) for Thomas A. Ackerman, aerographer, Ellsworth Station winter party, 1957.

References 

Nunataks of Queen Elizabeth Land